Agonidium birmanicum is a species of ground beetle in the subfamily Platyninae. It was described by Henry Walter Bates in 1894.

References

birmanicum
Beetles described in 1892